This is a list of butterflies of Guinea-Bissau. About 154 species are known from Guinea-Bissau, none of which is endemic.

Papilionidae

Papilioninae

Papilionini
Papilio nireus Linnaeus, 1758
Papilio dardanus Brown, 1776
Papilio demodocus Esper, [1798]
Papilio menestheus Drury, 1773

Leptocercini
Graphium angolanus baronis (Ungemach, 1932)
Graphium leonidas (Fabricius, 1793)

Pieridae

Coliadinae
Eurema brigitta (Stoll, [1780])
Eurema hecabe solifera (Butler, 1875)
Catopsilia florella (Fabricius, 1775)

Pierinae
Colotis antevippe (Boisduval, 1836)
Colotis euippe (Linnaeus, 1758)
Nepheronia argia (Fabricius, 1775)
Leptosia alcesta (Stoll, [1782])
Leptosia medusa (Cramer, 1777)

Pierini
Mylothris chloris (Fabricius, 1775)
Dixeia orbona (Geyer, [1837])
Belenois aurota (Fabricius, 1793)
Belenois calypso (Drury, 1773)
Belenois hedyle ianthe (Doubleday, 1842)

Lycaenidae

Miletinae

Miletini
Spalgis lemolea lemolea Druce, 1890
Spalgis lemolea pilos Druce, 1890

Poritiinae

Liptenini
Liptena ferrymani bissau Collins & Larsen, 2003
Pseuderesia eleaza (Hewitson, 1873)
Eresina maesseni Stempffer, 1956

Epitolini
Cerautola crowleyi (Sharpe, 1890)

Aphnaeinae
Cigaritis mozambica (Bertoloni, 1850)
Axiocerses harpax (Fabricius, 1775)
Aphnaeus orcas (Drury, 1782)

Theclinae
Myrina silenus (Fabricius, 1775)
Myrina subornata Lathy, 1903
Oxylides faunus (Drury, 1773)
Dapidodigma hymen (Fabricius, 1775)
Hypolycaena anara Larsen, 1986
Hypolycaena philippus (Fabricius, 1793)
Iolaus ismenias (Klug, 1834)
Iolaus calisto (Westwood, 1851)
Pilodeudorix zela (Hewitson, 1869)
Pilodeudorix aurivilliusi (Stempffer, 1954)
Paradeudorix eleala parallela (Collins & Larsen, 2000)
Paradeudorix eleala cufadana (Mendes & De Sousa, 2003)
Hypomyrina mimetica Libert, 2004
Deudorix antalus (Hopffer, 1855)
Deudorix lorisona abriana Libert, 2004

Polyommatinae

Lycaenesthini
Anthene amarah (Guérin-Méneville, 1849)
Anthene crawshayi (Butler, 1899)
Anthene larydas (Cramer, 1780)
Anthene liodes (Hewitson, 1874)
Anthene sylvanus (Drury, 1773)
Anthene hades (Bethune-Baker, 1910)

Polyommatini
Lampides boeticus (Linnaeus, 1767)
Cacyreus lingeus (Stoll, 1782)
Zizeeria knysna (Trimen, 1862)
Azanus mirza (Plötz, 1880)
Azanus isis (Drury, 1773)
Euchrysops malathana (Boisduval, 1833)
Euchrysops osiris (Hopffer, 1855)
Oboronia guessfeldti (Dewitz, 1879)
Chilades eleusis (Demaison, 1888)

Nymphalidae

Danainae

Danaini
Danaus chrysippus alcippus (Cramer, 1777)
Amauris niavius (Linnaeus, 1758)

Satyrinae

Melanitini
Melanitis leda (Linnaeus, 1758)
Melanitis libya Distant, 1882

Satyrini
Bicyclus angulosa (Butler, 1868)
Bicyclus dorothea (Cramer, 1779)
Bicyclus funebris (Guérin-Méneville, 1844)
Bicyclus mandanes Hewitson, 1873
Bicyclus milyas (Hewitson, 1864)
Bicyclus safitza (Westwood, 1850)
Bicyclus taenias (Hewitson, 1877)
Bicyclus vulgaris (Butler, 1868)
Bicyclus zinebi (Butler, 1869)
Ypthima doleta Kirby, 1880
Ypthimomorpha itonia (Hewitson, 1865)

Charaxinae

Charaxini
Charaxes varanes vologeses (Mabille, 1876)
Charaxes fulvescens senegala van Someren, 1975
Charaxes protoclea Feisthamel, 1850
Charaxes boueti Feisthamel, 1850
Charaxes jasius Poulton, 1926
Charaxes epijasius Reiche, 1850
Charaxes castor (Cramer, 1775)
Charaxes brutus (Cramer, 1779)
Charaxes numenes (Hewitson, 1859)
Charaxes imperialis Butler, 1874
Charaxes anticlea (Drury, 1782)
Charaxes viola Butler, 1866

Nymphalinae

Nymphalini
Vanessa cardui (Linnaeus, 1758)
Junonia chorimene (Guérin-Méneville, 1844)
Junonia hierta cebrene Trimen, 1870
Junonia oenone (Linnaeus, 1758)
Junonia orithya madagascariensis Guenée, 1865
Junonia sophia (Fabricius, 1793)
Junonia stygia (Aurivillius, 1894)
Junonia terea (Drury, 1773)
Precis antilope (Feisthamel, 1850)
Precis pelarga (Fabricius, 1775)
Hypolimnas anthedon (Doubleday, 1845)
Hypolimnas misippus (Linnaeus, 1764)

Biblidinae

Biblidini
Byblia anvatara crameri Aurivillius, 1894

Limenitinae

Limenitidini
Cymothoe mabillei Overlaet, 1944
Pseudacraea eurytus (Linnaeus, 1758)
Pseudacraea lucretia (Cramer, [1775])

Neptidini
Neptis agouale Pierre-Baltus, 1978
Neptis kiriakoffi Overlaet, 1955
Neptis melicerta (Drury, 1773)
Neptis nemetes Hewitson, 1868
Neptis quintilla Mabille, 1890
Neptis nysiades Hewitson, 1868
Neptis serena Overlaet, 1955

Adoliadini
Hamanumida daedalus (Fabricius, 1775)
Aterica galene (Brown, 1776)
Euriphene ampedusa (Hewitson, 1866)
Euriphene gambiae Feisthamel, 1850
Bebearia cocalia (Fabricius, 1793)
Bebearia senegalensis (Herrich-Schaeffer, 1858)
Bebearia sophus phreone (Feisthamel, 1850)
Bebearia phantasina ultima Hecq, 1990
Euphaedra medon pholus (van der Hoeven, 1840)
Euphaedra hastiri Hecq, 1981
Euphaedra xypete (Hewitson, 1865)
Euphaedra inanum (Butler, 1873)
Euphaedra villiersi Condamin, 1964
Euphaedra harpalyce (Cramer, 1777)

Heliconiinae

Acraeini
Acraea camaena (Drury, 1773)
Acraea neobule Doubleday, 1847
Acraea zetes (Linnaeus, 1758)
Acraea egina (Cramer, 1775)
Acraea caecilia (Fabricius, 1781)
Acraea pseudegina Westwood, 1852
Acraea alcinoe Felder & Felder, 1865
Acraea epaea (Cramer, 1779)
Acraea umbra carpenteri (Le Doux, 1937)
Acraea bonasia (Fabricius, 1775)
Acraea encedon (Linnaeus, 1758)
Acraea serena (Fabricius, 1775)

Vagrantini
Phalanta phalantha aethiopica (Rothschild & Jordan, 1903)

Hesperiidae

Coeliadinae
Coeliades aeschylus (Plötz, 1884)
Coeliades forestan (Stoll, [1782])
Coeliades pisistratus (Fabricius, 1793)

Pyrginae

Celaenorrhinini
Sarangesa brigida (Plötz, 1879)

Tagiadini
Tagiades flesus (Fabricius, 1781)

Carcharodini
Spialia ploetzi occidentalis de Jong, 1977
Spialia spio (Linnaeus, 1764)

Hesperiinae

Aeromachini
Gorgyra subfacatus (Mabille, 1890)
Pardaleodes incerta murcia (Plötz, 1883)
Xanthodisca rega (Mabille, 1890)
Acleros ploetzi Mabille, 1890
Semalea pulvina (Plötz, 1879)
Meza indusiata (Mabille, 1891)
Meza meza (Hewitson, 1877)
Zophopetes cerymica (Hewitson, 1867)
Fresna cojo (Karsch, 1893)

Baorini
Pelopidas thrax (Hübner, 1821)
Borbo fatuellus (Hopffer, 1855)
Borbo gemella (Mabille, 1884)
Gegenes niso brevicornis (Plötz, 1884)

See also
Geography of Guinea-Bissau
Wildlife of Guinea-Bissau

References

Seitz, A. Die Gross-Schmetterlinge der Erde 13: Die Afrikanischen Tagfalter. Plates
Seitz, A. Die Gross-Schmetterlinge der Erde 13: Die Afrikanischen Tagfalter. Text (in German)

Guinea-B
Guinea-Bissau
Guinea-Bissau
Butterflies